The Worker is a British sitcom that aired on ITV from 1965 to 1978. Co-written by and starring comedian Charlie Drake, the programme revolved around a man who has been dismissed from nearly 1,000 jobs.

Cast
Charlie Drake - Charlie
Percy Herbert - Mr Whittaker (series 1)
Henry McGee - Mr Pugh (series 2 onwards)
Frank Williams - Vicar

Plot
Charlie, although willing to work, has been dismissed from the 980 jobs that the local Labour Exchange has found him over the previous 20 years. Mr Whittaker, and later Mr Pugh, is the clerk at the exchange who tries to find Charlie a suitable job.

Episodes
The first two series of The Worker, a total of thirteen 35 minute episodes, aired in 1965 on Saturdays at 8.25pm. The next two series - by now in colour - broadcast from 1969 to 1970, with the first airing on Mondays at 9.30pm and the second on Thursdays at 9.00pm. This time the twelve episodes were 30 minutes long. A short special as part of All-Star Comedy Carnival was shown on Christmas Day 1970. The final ten episodes - all of about 15 minutes duration - aired in 1978. The first eight were shown as part of Bruce Forsyth's Big Night, the ninth as a stand-alone programme and the final episode as part of Bruce Forsyth's Christmas Eve.

Due to the archival policies of the time, not all of the programme exist in the archives. The 1970 Christmas short is missing and is presumed wiped. All but the first episode of the third series and the entire fourth series exist only in black-and-white, though they were originally shot in colour.

Series One

Series Two
The closing logo for Series Two reads: "An ATV Production by arrangement with Bernard Delfont".

Series Three

Series Four

Christmas Special

Series Five

DVD release
The 25 episodes from the first four series of The Worker were released on DVD on 28 May 2007. The colour episodes were presented in their surviving black and white versions with ITC Entertainment logos. The only surviving colour episode from the original series ("Hallo, Cobbler" with incomplete end titles) is included as an extra. This DVD also included episodes 3-5 from the 1978 series, claimed to be the only ones that survive, with introductions and endpieces by Bruce Forsyth.

References
General

Specific

External links

1960s British sitcoms
1970s British sitcoms
1965 British television series debuts
1978 British television series endings
ITV sitcoms
English-language television shows
Lost television shows
London Weekend Television shows
Television shows produced by Associated Television (ATV)
Television shows set in London